Sar Galan or Sargolan may refer to:
 Sar Galan, Razavi Khorasan